Miaenia tonsa is a species of beetle in the family Cerambycidae. It was described by Bates in 1873.

References

Miaenia
Beetles described in 1873